Standridge is an English family name. It is habitational name from a place so called in Lancashire. Notable people with the surname include:

Billy Standridge (born 1953), American former NASCAR driver
David Standridge, American politician
Glenn Standridge, multi-platinum producer, songwriter, DJ and Multi-Instrumentalist; member of Jake and the Phatman
Greg Standridge (born c. 1967), member of the Arkansas State Senate since 2015
Jason Standridge (born 1978), American professional baseball pitcher
Melissa Standridge (born 1962), American judge on the Kansas Court of Appeals
Pete Standridge (1891–1963), American Major League Baseball pitcher
Rob Standridge, American pharmacy owner and politician (Republican) who has served in the Oklahoma Senate
Zak Standridge (born c. 1980), Author, artist, anime and manga writer

Surnames of British Isles origin
English-language surnames
English toponymic surnames